Moose Hill Farm is a  open space preserve and historic farm complex located in Sharon, Massachusetts near the  summit of Moose Hill. The property, acquired in 2005 by the land conservation non-profit organization The Trustees of Reservations, includes farmland, woodlots, 21 farm buildings, hiking trails, stands of mature American Chestnuts, and scenic vistas of the Boston skyline. Moose Hill Farm is part of a larger area of protected open space including state land and the Massachusetts Audubon Society's Moose Hill Wildlife Sanctuary.

Description

The reservation is open to hiking, picnicking, and cross country skiing. Dogs are allowed at Moose Hill Farm subject to "Guidelines for Dog Walkers". The Trustees of Reservations staff offer guided interpretive programs in season.

History
The property once belonged to industrialist Henry P. Kendall, owner of the multi-national Kendall Company. Kendall acquired Moose Hill Farm which housed a Guernsey dairy herd in the 1940s. Prior to that, the property had been used as a dairy and sheep farm since the 1800s.

Gallery

References

External links

The Trustees of Reservations: Moose Hill Farm
Moose Hill Farm trail map
Mass Audubon Moose Hill Wildlife Sanctuary

Protected areas of Norfolk County, Massachusetts
The Trustees of Reservations
Open space reserves of Massachusetts
Farms in Massachusetts
Buildings and structures in Norfolk County, Massachusetts
Protected areas established in 2005
2005 establishments in Massachusetts